Sigurd Christian Brinch (3 October 1874 – 1956) was a Norwegian manager and politician. 

Brinch was born in Christiania to Johan Christian Hønen and Michaline Beate Flisager. He was director of the energy company Arendals Fossekompani from 1912, and resided in Arendal. He was elected representative to the Stortinget for the periods 1934–1936 and 1937–1945, for the Conservative Party. He died in 1956.

References

1874 births
1956 deaths
Businesspeople from Oslo
People from Arendal
Aust-Agder politicians
Conservative Party (Norway) politicians
Members of the Storting
Politicians from Oslo